The RXV/SXV series are four-stroke, v-twin off road (RXV) or dual sport supermoto (SXV) motorcycles produced by Aprilia since 2006. Both versions have either  or  engine sizes.

Frame/chassis
The RXV/SXV's frame is made of a combination of tubular steel and aluminum plates. The compact engine fits into the frame in such a way that the air filter sits on top of the engine, below the gas tank, rather than the more traditional under-the-seat location. This allows for a lower distribution of weight.

Engine
The RXV/SXV has a v-twin engine, and is one of the first off-road motorcycles to feature fuel injection. The 450 has a displacement of 449 cc, while the 550 has a displacement of 549 cc. Each engine has a single-overhead-cam and four valves per cylinder. The 77-degree cylinder angle minimizes vibration. Both are dry sump, with a separate oil tank for the gearbox and engine. 

The 450 produces a claimed  at the crank, while the 550 produces a claimed 70.

References

External links

RXV SXV
Dual-sport motorcycles
Off-road motorcycles
Motorcycles introduced in 2006